Al-Mizhar American Academy (AAM) is an American school offering American curriculum based on US Common Core standards. The school is located in  Al-Mizhar Mirdif, Dubai, United Arab Emirates. It is a private institution managed by Taaleem, a UAE-based company and one of the largest education providers in the Middle East.

Curriculum
The school uses an American curriculum based on the US Common Core State Standards and is one of the first schools in the UAE to use standards-based curriculum by adopting Kent County  curriculum from the state of Michigan. The school provides an education that emphasizes academic rigor as well as the essential skills of critical thinking and creativity. The school language of instruction is English. All students have the opportunity to study different languages with an emphasis on Arabic.

KHDA Inspection Reports
The Knowledge and Human Development Authority (KHDA) is an educational quality assurance authority in Dubai, United Arab Emirates. They are responsible for the growth, direction,  and quality of private education and learning in Dubai. They have consistently rated the school as "good."

References

External links
 

Schools in Dubai
International schools in Dubai
International Baccalaureate schools in the United Arab Emirates
American international schools in the United Arab Emirates
Private schools in the United Arab Emirates
Educational institutions established in 2005
2005 establishments in the United Arab Emirates